The 2019–20 Senior Women's National Football Championship, also known as Hero Senior Women's National Football Championship for sponsorship reasons, was the 25th edition of the Senior Women's National Football Championship, the premier competition in India for women's teams representing regional and state football associations. The tournament was hosted in Pasighat, Arunachal Pradesh, between 10 and 24 September 2019 at the Indira Gandhi Golden High School, Kiyit Secondary School and Daying Ering Football Stadium, Nari. 

Manipur, who were the defending champions retained the title beating Railways 1–0 in the final. Manipur's Bala Devi, with 21 goals, was the highest scorer of the tournament. Her side's goalkeeper Panthoi Chanu was bestowed with the best goalkeeper award.

Format
30 teams competed in the tournament and were split into eight groups of three to four teams each in the preliminary round.

Round dates

Group stage

Group A

Group B

Group C

Group D

Group E

Group F

Group G

Group H

Bracket

Quarter-finals
*Quarter-finals were played on 19 and 20 September 2019.

Semi-finals
*Semi-finals were played on 22 September 2019.

Final

References

External links
 Senior Women's National Football Championship on the All India Football Federation website

Senior Women's National Football Championship
2019–20 in Indian football
Pasighat
Sport in Arunachal Pradesh